Tomàs Garcés i Miravet (9 October 1901 – 16 November 1993, Barcelona) was a Catalan poet and lawyer.

Garcés was born in Barcelona. He studied law, philosophy, and literature at the University of Barcelona.

At the time of the Spanish Civil War Garcés fled to France where he was a teacher of Spanish language in the University of Toulouse. He returned to Catalonia in 1947.

Tomas was called "The Catalan poet of song" for his short regular verses.

He worked in several literary publications: Mar Vella, which he founded, and also Ariel, Serra d'Or, Revista de Catalunya and also La Publicitat, in which he published his works under the pseudonym "Ship-Boy".

For his works he was awarded several prizes, including The City of Barcelona Award, The Generalitat de Catalunya award, Crítica Serra d'Or, Creu de Sant Jordi and Premi d'Honor de les Lletres Catalanes.

External links 

 Tomàs Garcés at the AELC (Association of Writers in Catalan Language), in Catalan, English and Spanish.
 Webpage devoted to Tomàs Garcés (lletrA (UOC), Catalan Literature Online) 

1901 births
1993 deaths
Catalan-language poets
Poets from Catalonia
Lawyers from Barcelona
Premi d'Honor de les Lletres Catalanes winners
20th-century Spanish poets
20th-century male writers